Colin Arthur Wood (born 15 June 1943) is a British musician engaged in the field of jazz and rock music.

Wood was born in Camberwell, South East London, & was moved to Somerset in 1950. He played jazz piano while still at school. In 1962 he went to Durham University to study mathematics. In 1965 he moved to London to  play with Bill Nile's Delta Jazz Band and with Monty Sunshine (1968). He was also playing on rock sessions with The Yardbirds, David Bowie, Cat Stevens, Kevin Coyne and was the keyboardist on two songs included as part of the debut album of Uriah Heep. Wood, whose other musical talents also include playing the flute, did not, however (although offered the job), become an official member of the band. He lectured in maths for a time while freelancing musically. In September 1977 he joined Acker Bilk and remained with him into the 2000s.

Discography

With Uriah Heep
Very 'eavy... Very 'umble (1970)

With Siren
Siren

With Chris Barber / Kenny Ball / Acker Bilk
The Ultimate

Any with Acker's Paramount Jazz Band since 1978

References
 John Chilton: Who's who of British Jazz London: Continuum 2004;   (2nd ed.)

External links
Colin Wood at The Milarus Mansion

1943 births
Living people
People from Camberwell
British rock keyboardists
British jazz keyboardists
Uriah Heep (band) members
Alumni of Grey College, Durham
Suns of Arqa members